Malt Kiln Farmhouse is an historic building in Greenhalgh-with-Thistleton, Lancashire, England. It is believed to date to the mid-18th century, and has been designated a Grade II listed building by Historic England. The property is located on a short lane just off the northern side of Thistleton Road.

The building is constructed of rendered brick with a slate roof in two storeys and with a symmetrical two-bay front.  In the centre is an open gabled porch.  The windows are 12-pane sashes.  At the rear is a large stairlight.

John Cumsty was the farm's proprietor in the early 20th century.

See also
Listed buildings in Greenhalgh-with-Thistleton

Notes

References

External links
A view of the property from Thistleton Road in 2009 – Google Street View

Houses completed in the 18th century
Grade II listed buildings in Lancashire
Farmhouses in England
Buildings and structures in the Borough of Fylde